Catalina Cuellar Gempeler (born August 25, 1984) is a Colombian microbial ecologist and marine microbiologist, currently teaching and doing research at Humboldt State University. Her research focuses mainly on understanding microbial meta-community and eco-evolutionary dynamics. The Catalina Cuellar-Gempeler lab is currently focused on studying the interactions between hosts and their microbial communities. The lab's main emphasis is on the microbes used in digestion in the Californian and Eastern, carnivorous pitcher plants. In March 2021, Cuellar-Gempeler was awarded an Early Career grant for $1 million by the National Science Foundation.

Early life and education 
Cuellar-Gempeler was born on August 25, 1984 in Bogota, Colombia. She is the oldest of three children. Her father Carlos Cuellar is a Colombian, gastroenterologist in Bogota, while her mother, Emilia Gempeler, of Swiss descent, is a senior occupational health nurse. As a young child, and teenager, Cuellar-Gempeler attended Helvetia school, a private multilingual (Spanish, German, French) Swiss school located in Suba, Bogotá, Colombia. Cuellar-Gempeler showed an interest in microbes early on while on a field trip to Sierra Nevada del Cocuy in Colombia. When she was back home from this field trip she couldn’t stop thinking about the microbes living around her, whose lives unfold much quicker than human lives do. Soon after her high-school graduation, Catalina started her studies at Universidad de Los Andes in Bogota, graduating with both a B.Sc. in biology and a B.Sc. in microbiology in 2008. During college, Catalina was an outstanding student, who thrived in all subjects ranging from Cellular biology to Chemistry and Physics. She attended graduate school at the University of Texas at Austin where she earned a PhD in integrative biology. Catalina's PhD thesis focused on ecological and evolutionary processes driving crustacean-associated microbial communities. Specifically, her PhD project investigated the effects of fiddler crab on sediment bacteria in the Yucatán Peninsula, under the supervision of Pablo Munguia.

Academic career 
After obtaining her Ph.D. in 2015, Cuellar-Gempeler was hired as a post-doctoral scholar at Florida State University for two years. In 2018, she and her husband moved to Humboldt State University in Aracata, California, where she is an assistant professor. Cuellar-Gempeler created the Catalina Cuellar-Gempeler lab where she investigates the functioning and assembly of microbial communities hosted by animals and plants. The lab's main research themes comprise Ecological theory, Microbiology and Natural History.

Research and teaching 
Since the beginning of her academic career, Catalina has been interested not only in understanding the interaction between metazoans and microorganisms, but also in environmental education. Before graduating from Universidad de Los Andes, she took a semester off to take a field guiding course at Kruger National Park, South Africa, where she improved her knowledge about African ecosystems and her leading and teaching skills. As a PhD candidate at the  University of Texas at Austin she worked as an assistant teacher for Molecules to Organisms, Ecology, Limnology and Scientific inquiry. Currently, at her assistant professor appointment she is teaching General Microbiology, Microbial Ecology and Marine microbiology. Cuellar Gempeler's lab main focus is on: Biodiversity-Ecosystem function relationships in pitcher plant meta-communities, Microbial ecology of conservation of Astragalus applegatei's mycorrhizae, and Microbiome of invasive marine invertebrates. Her lab's main research areas are:

 Biodiversity-Ecosystem function relationships in pitcher plant metacommunities - Research exploring the degradative functioning of bacterial communities, with investigation mostly based on experimental studies and on field sampling of the microbial biodiversity in pitcher plants. 
 Microbial ecology of conservation: Astragalus applegatei 's mycorrhizae - Research exploring the effect of oil microorganisms on the success of populations of endangered plants. This branch of research is being done in collaboration with Kerry Byrne. 
 Microbiome of invasive marine invertebrates - Research investigating the variation of microbial communities within an invasive, wide-spread anemone. The main focus of this research is to understand which conditions are driving microbial community assembly. Will Ryan and Stacy Krueger-Hadfield from University of Alabama at Birmingham are collaborating on this project.

Awards and honors 
Catalina has been awarded an Early Career grant for $1 million by the National Science Foundation. This award is given to outstanding academics who have great potential to become role models in their communities while engaging in both research and education.

Selected publications 

 C. Cuellar-Gempeler. 2021. Diversity-function relationships and the underlying ecological mechanisms in host-associated microbial communities. In: Advances in Environmental Microbiology, Vol 8. 297-326
 Munoz-Ucros, J., M. Zwetsloot, C. Cuellar-Gempeler and T. Bauerle. Spatio-temporal patterns of rhizosphere microbiome assembly: from ecological theory to agricultural application. Journal of Applied Ecology 58(5):894-904
 ​Cuellar-Gempeler, C. and P. Munguia. 2019. Habitat filters mediate successional trajectories in bacterial communities associated with the striped shore crab. Oecologia 191(4): 957-970 
 T.E. Miller, M. L. Buhler and C. Cuellar-Gempeler. 2019. Species-specific differences determine responses to a resource pulse and predation. Oecologia 190(1) 169-178 
 C. Cuellar-Gempeler, and M. Leibold. 2019. Key colonist pools and habitat filters mediate diversity of fiddler crab-associated microbial communities. Ecology 100(4): e02628
 C. Cuellar-Gempeler and M.A. Leibold, 2018. Multiple colonist pools shape fiddler crab-associated microbial communities. The ISME Journal 12:825-837. Accession number: PRJNA496296
 E. Canter, C. Cuellar-Gempeler, A. Pastore, T.E. Miller and O. Mason, 2018. Predator identity more than predator richness structures aquatic microbial assemblages in Sarracenia purpurea leaves. Ecology 
 Holdridge, E., C. Cuellar-Gempeler, and C. terHost, 2016. A shift from exploitation to interference competition with increasing density affects population and community dynamics. Ecology and Evolution 6 (15):5333-5341
 Cuellar-Gempeler, C. and P. Munguia. 2013. Fiddler crabs affect bacterial assemblages in mangrove forest sediments. Community Ecology 14(1): 59-66

References

External links 

 Catalina Cuellar-Gempeler | Biological Sciences
https://cuellar-gempeler-lab.weebly.com/
https://sites.google.com/site/catalinacuellargempeler/otros/Bio

Colombian scientists
Microbiologists
Women academics
1984 births
Living people